Akkulapeta is a village in Srikakulam district of the Indian state of Andhra Pradesh. It is located in Amudalavalasa mandal.

Demographics
According to Indian census, 2001, the demographic details of this village is as follows:
 Total Population: 	760  in 187 Households.
 Male Population: 	369
 Female Population: 	391
 Children Under 6-years: 	80 (Boys - 38 and Girls - 42)
 Total Literates: 	472

References

Villages in Srikakulam district